The men's team competition at the 2010 European Judo Championships was held on 25 April at the Ferry-Dusika-Hallenstadion in Vienna, Austria.

Results

Repechage

References

External links
 

Mteam
EU 2010
European Men's Team Judo Championships